Marco Claudio Campi is an engineer and a mathematician who specializes in data science and inductive methods. He is a co-creator of the so-called "scenario approach" (see scenario optimization). In 2012 he was elevated to the grade of Fellow of the Institute of Electrical and Electronics Engineers (IEEE) for contributions to stochastic and randomized methods in systems and control. In 2008, he was bestowed the George S. Axelby Award. He holds a permanent appointment with the University of Brescia, Italy, while also collaborating with various research institutions, universities and NASA.

References

External links
 Interview with Marco C. Campi 
 Introduction to the Scenario Approach - four talks by M.C. Campi: talk 1/4 ; talk 2/4 ; talk 3/4 ; talk 4/4 

Year of birth missing (living people)
Living people
Italian mathematicians
Engineers from Milan